"TKO (Knock You Out)" is a song written by Lars Erlandsson, Fredrik Lenander and Paul Rein, and performed by the Swedish pop girl group, Bubbles at Melodifestivalen 2003. From the fourth semifinal in the town of Sundsvall, the song made it through Tittarnas val, to the finals inside the Stockholm Globe Arena, where it ended up ninth. The song was also released as a single., peaking at 7th position at the Swedish singles chart.

The song received a Svensktoppen test on 6 April 2003, but failed to enter chart.

Charts

Weekly charts

Year-end charts

References 

2003 singles
Disco songs
English-language Swedish songs
Melodifestivalen songs of 2003
2003 songs
Songs written by Paul Rein